The Liverpool Blue Coat School is a grammar school in Liverpool, England. It was founded in 1708 by Bryan Blundell and the Reverend Robert Styth as the Liverpool Blue Coat Hospital and was for many years a boys' boarding school before restoring in 2002 its original policy of accepting boys and girls. 

The school holds a long-standing academic tradition; the acceptance rate to be admitted is around fifteen percent. Examination results consistently place the Blue Coat top of the national GCSE and A-level tables. In 2015 it was The Sunday Times State School of the Year. And in 2016 the Blue Coat was ranked as the best school in the country based on GCSE results.

History

The Bluecoat School

The school was founded in 1708 by Bryan Blundell and the Rev Robert Styth, a theology graduate of Brasenose College, Oxford as "a school for teaching poor children to read, write and cast accounts". The original charity school expanded rapidly and a new building, the present Bluecoat Arts Centre, opened in 1718. By the time of Blundell's death in 1756 there were 70 boys and 30 girls at the school, many apprenticed to local trades, especially maritime ones connected to the port. Some Old Blues became mates or masters of their ships, many emigrating to the colonies. After Blundell's death his sons further expanded the building to accommodate 200 pupils, with a new workroom, sick room, chapel and refectory. A reminder of the building's school days is some graffiti dating from the 18th century, carved into cornerstones in a secluded part of the front courtyard.

Move to Wavertree

At the start of the 20th century it was decided that the school needed to move from the polluted town centre to somewhere quieter, and the village of Wavertree was the site chosen. The architects chosen for the design of the new building were Briggs, Wolstenholme & Thornely, most notable for the design of the Port of Liverpool Building. In 1906 the school took possession of the building, which was later designated Grade II-listed*. Later additions include a clock tower and the Fenwick Memorial Chapel: used for assemblies by the school.

Redevelopment
In 2004 the school received a government grant of almost £8 million, together with £1 million from its foundation governors, enabling an expansion and redevelopment of its site.

In 2004 work began on redeveloping the Wavertree site. Original buildings remained intact but the southern wing was converted into private accommodation and sold to part-fund the development. The school chapel, clock tower, board room, and former music room, together with administrative rooms and the entrance to the original building, were transferred to a new school foundation and made available to hire for private functions. Buildings that had been added to the north end of the site during the second half of the 20th century, including a swimming pool, a sixth-form centre, a gym and squash courts, were demolished to make way for new facilities. The North Wing of the original school was renovated and a new building extended it into the area previously known as the North Yard. This included laboratories, a new main entrance, an administration block, music rooms, recording and dance studios, and dining and sports halls. The remainder of the North Yard was upgraded to provide better outdoor sports facilities. The old dining hall, beneath Shirley Hall at the heart of the original building, became a library with a mezzanine ICT suite. The previous library space, itself a former dormitory, was refurbished as the new sixth-form facility.

House system
The school has six houses. Upon entrance in Year 7, pupils are allocated a house, which then decides which form they are put into until sixth form, which they remain a member of throughout their time at The Blue Coat School. As well as the students, teachers at the school are often members of a house. There are approximately thirty students in a form and approximately 220 students per house. The houses are governed by a House Council which are composed of Heads of House, House Deputies, Form Captains and a member of staff. There are regular inter-house competitions, ranging from the inter-house football competition to inter-house debating competitions, in which the houses can gain house points which are then added to a running total and published in league tables, culminating in the annual inter-house league table. The newest houses are Turing and Tod Family which became the fifth and sixth houses of the current school in 2015 and 2017 respectively, to accommodate the 30 new additional first year students, and were previously named after one of the school's former Provosts. There are also a number of boarding houses that were discontinued when the school ceased to be a boarding school in the late 20th century.

The school houses have recently been renamed from founders of the school, such as Blundell, to historical role models, such as Alan Turing, primarily from the UK due to backlash for the founders being slave traders. The form names were decided by a student vote in 2022, from a selection of names also provided by students.

School Houses
 	
 Curie (Formerly Bingham)
 Franklin (Formerly Blundell)
 Roscoe (Formerly Graham)
 Seacole (Formerly Shirley)
 Turing (Formerly Styth)
 Tod

 
Boarding Houses (Defunct)
 	 
 Earle
 MacAuley
 Styth
 Tinne

Brotherly Society
The school's alumni association is the Brotherly Society, founded in 1838. Alumni are known as "Old Blues". The society was set up to provide help, advice and in some cases financial assistance to students for at least two years after leaving the school.
Since the Second World War there has been less need for such assistance so the Society has turned its efforts towards objects that would benefit the School in general.

The generosity of the Society can be found throughout the Blue Coat School's history. In 1938, to celebrate the Society's centenary, the Society provided the oak pews in the chapel. In 1963 the Society provided the stained glass south window of the Chapel to celebrate its 125th anniversary, and in 1952 the Old Blues' Memorial Library was presented in remembrance of the Old Blues who gave their lives in the two World Wars.

Head teachers

The Squirrel
The school's publication is The Squirrel. The magazine is currently published annually and is almost entirely written and produced by students. The magazine was first released in the Summer of 1949 under the leadership of the Provost John Bingham in order to show the 'fruits of hard work' and the activities, achievements, and involvement of the students and staff in school life.

During the 1950s The Squirrel entered an era of particular popularity and enthusiasm, ultimately leading to its publication becoming a termly occurrence. It was during this period that the magazine developed some of its most memorable features, notably including De Praefectis which recorded the various humorous situations and conversations of prefects at the school and is mostly remembered for satirising the eccentricities of individual prefects, often employing a pretentious overuse of Latin to this effect. In subsequent years various other magazines written by students were produced as parodies of The Squirrel, most notably in the form of The Swivel which gained an underground following and was particularly popular on account of the strong criticisms it leveled at the school and its masters.

In 2017 the school published The Squirrel both in paper form and online for the first time. A new website 'The Squirrel Blog' was created both to publish current and future editions of the magazine and to digitalise the school's archive of every issue of The Squirrel since 1949.

Notable alumni
Richard Ansdell, painter
Mitch Benn, musician and comedian
Graham Bickley, actor
Stephen Broadbent, sculptor
Philip Clarke, businessman
Craig Curran, footballer
Stuart Ford, entertainment executive
Evan Harris, politician
Jonathan Harvey, playwright
Alfred Lennon, father of John Lennon
Kevin Nolan, footballer and coach
Andrew Norton, roboticist and politician
Steve Parry, swimmer
Chris Rennard, Baron Rennard

References

External links
 Official school website
 BBC Education League Tables listing
 Ofsted inspection report (June 2004)
 Extract from Discovering Historic Wavertree
 Blue Coat Arts Centre
 South Wing Apartments Development
 Leavers Ball 2006 Pictures

Grammar schools in Liverpool
1708 establishments in England
Educational institutions established in 1708
Grade II* listed buildings in Liverpool
Bluecoat schools
Academies in Liverpool